Lee Jong-wook (Hangul: 이종욱; 12 April 1945 – 22 May 2006) was a South Korean physician. He was the director-general of the World Health Organization for three years. Lee joined the WHO in 1983, working on a variety of projects including the Global Programme for Vaccines and Immunizations and Stop Tuberculosis. He began his term as director-general in 2004, and was the first figure from Korea to lead an international agency.

In 2004, Lee was listed as one of the 100 most influential people in the world by Time magazine.

Early life
Born on 12 April 1945 in what is now Seoul, South Korea.

Lee received a Bachelors in Engineering from Hanyang University, followed by a medical degree at Seoul National University, and a Master of Medicine at the University of Hawaii in public health. He is the third son in a family of six children; he has three brothers and two sisters. Two of his brothers are professors.

Lee took care of leprosy patients in Anyang, South Korea when he was studying medicine. There were few medical facilities set up at the time and he worked in a volunteer capacity. He met and later married Kaburaki Reiko, a Japanese woman who visited Korea in order to volunteer in the country.

WHO career 
He worked at the World Health Organization (WHO), at country, regional and headquarter levels for 23 years. His work in WHO started in 1983 when he worked with leprosy in Fiji. He started his work as an advisor on leprosy, and later also treated tuberculosis and promoted the vaccination of children against preventable diseases.

In 1994, Lee moved to Geneva to work at WHO headquarters as chief in prevention and vaccines. In 1995, he was nicknamed Vaccine Czar according to Scientific American. Lee became official candidate for 6th director-generals of WHO.

 1983–2006: Staff of WHO
 1994–98: Director in Global Programme for Vaccines and Immunization, and Executive Secretary, Children's Vaccine Initiative
 1998–99: Senior Policy Adviser to 5th General, Gro Harlem Brundtland
 1999–2000: Special Representative of the Director-General
 2003–2006: Director-General of WHO

He had said that global efforts to control the HIV/AIDS pandemic would be the right course that would give meaning to his tenure as director-general of the agency.

The 3 by 5 policy, which was the basic idea of Lee, was largely criticized by many concerned people. International AIDS Society president Joep Lange, had a comment that the project was “totally unrealistic”. Médecins sans Frontières, also expressed similar reservations toward Lee's plan.

He visited 60 countries in the three years of his Generalship including Darfur, Sudan, sites of the Indian Ocean tsunami, Madagascar, Mauritius.  He was famed as a man of action during this time. His adventurous spirit led him to "experience more, see more, and do more," said his son Tadahiro.

Death and commemoration
He died on 22 May 2006, in intensive care unit of Geneva University Hospital, Switzerland, following emergency surgery for a blood clot in the brain (a subdural hematoma). He had been preparing for UN general meetings when he fell ill at a weekend luncheon.

Secretary General of United Nations at that time, Kofi Annan mentioned 

President George W. Bush of the United States said

He was posthumously awarded the Hibiscus Cordon (Grand Cross) of the Order of Civil Merit by the South Korean government.
He was survived by Reiko Kaburaki Lee; the couple has one son, Tadahiro Lee. Reiko continues to volunteer in Peru helping poor women and children.

Memorial award
The South Korean government officially announced the establishment of the a Memorial Prize in Lee's memory. After his death, You Si min, the Minister of Health and Welfare of the Republic of Korea, officially revealed the plans concerning the new awards and urged other nations and persons concerned to participate at a meeting of WHO in 2007.  Mr. Lee Sung-joo, who is permanent representative of the Republic of Korea, spoke of the award in Dr. Lee's memory to motivate and inspire young leaders aspiring to be the next Dr. Lee Jong-wook.

Starting in 2009, the awards would be given for mainly the fields "young leadership" and "contributor of health management" (especially for epidemics) at the annual assembly of WHO, which takes place in May each year.

See also
 Kyungbock High School

References

External links

 WHO biography
 WHO statement on the death of Lee Jong-wook
 Dr. Lee Jong-wook elected Director-General – International Chronicle
 

1945 births
2006 deaths
20th-century South Korean physicians
21st-century South Korean physicians
Kyungbock High School alumni
Mugunghwa Medals of the Order of Civil Merit (Korea)
Seoul National University alumni
South Korean officials of the United Nations
South Korean public health doctors
University of Hawaiʻi at Mānoa alumni
World Health Organization officials
Hanyang University alumni